The 2005–06 season was PFC CSKA Sofia's 58th consecutive season in A Group. This article shows player statistics and all matches (official and friendly) that the club have and will play during the 2007–08 season.

Club

Team kits
The team kits for the 2005–06 season are produced by Uhlsport and sponsored by Vivatel.

Squad

Competitions

A Group

Table

Results summary

Results by round

Fixtures and results 

* - On 18 August 2005 Pirin Blagoevgrad was removed from A PFG after Round 2 because of outstanding obligations to National Insurance Institute. All results of Pirin so far are canceled and their opponents in the next meetings will rest. PFC Pirin has the right to renew its participation in the league for season 2005/2006 in South-West V AFG.

Bulgarian Cup

Bulgarian Supercup

CSKA lost the game on penalty shoot-out after the extra time.

UEFA Champions League

UEFA Cup

Group stage

Group A

References

External links
CSKA Official Site
CSKA Fan Page with up-to-date information
Bulgarian A Professional Football Group Site

PFC CSKA Sofia seasons
Cska Sofia